José Andrés Brenes (born 18 December 1964) is a Costa Rican cyclist. He competed in the men's cross-country mountain biking event at the 1996 Summer Olympics.

References

External links
 

1964 births
Living people
Costa Rican male cyclists
Olympic cyclists of Costa Rica
Cyclists at the 1996 Summer Olympics
People from Cartago Province
Pan American Games silver medalists for Costa Rica
Cyclists at the 1995 Pan American Games
Pan American Games medalists in cycling
Medalists at the 1995 Pan American Games